Khwaab Ankhain Khwahish Chehre is a Hum TV drama which started airing on 11 July 2011.

Cast
 Rubina Ashraf
 Kanwar Arsalan
 Maria Zahid
 Lubna Aslam
 Fazila Qazi
 Zaheen Tahira
 Farhan Ally Agha
 Asad Malik

References

2011 Pakistani television series debuts
Pakistani drama television series
Urdu-language television shows
Hum TV original programming